Baron Grimthorpe, of Grimthorpe in the East Riding of the County of York, is a title in the Peerage of the United Kingdom. It was created on 17 February 1886 for the lawyer and architect Edmund Beckett, 5th Baronet, with remainder to the heirs male of his father. He was succeeded according to the special remainder by his nephew, the second Baron. He had earlier represented Grimsby in Parliament.  the titles are held by the latter's great-grandson, the fifth Baron, who succeeded his father in 2003.

The Beckett baronetcy, of Leeds in the County of York, was created in the Baronetage of the United Kingdom in 1813 for John Beckett, Permanent Under-Secretary of State at the Home Office. His eldest son, the second Baronet, was a Tory politician. On his death the title passed to his younger brother, the third Baronet, and then to another brother, the fourth Baronet. The latter represented the West Riding of Yorkshire in Parliament. He was succeeded by his eldest son, the fifth Baronet, who was raised to the peerage as Baron Grimthorpe in 1886.

Another member of the Beckett family was the Conservative politician Gervase Beckett. He was the younger brother of the second Baron Grimthorpe.

Beckett baronets, of Leeds (1813) 
Sir John Beckett, 1st Baronet (1743–1826)
Sir John Beckett, 2nd Baronet (1775–1847)
Sir Thomas Beckett, 3rd Baronet (1779–1872)
Sir Edmund Beckett, 4th Baronet (1787–1874)
Sir Edmund Beckett, 5th Baronet (1816–1905) (created Baron Grimthorpe in 1886)

Barons Grimthorpe (1886) 
Edmund Beckett, 1st Baron Grimthorpe (1816–1905)
Ernest William Beckett, 2nd Baron Grimthorpe (1856–1917)
Ralph William Ernest Beckett, 3rd Baron Grimthorpe (1891–1963)
Christopher John Beckett, 4th Baron Grimthorpe (1915–2003)
Edward John Beckett, 5th Baron Grimthorpe (born 1954)

The heir apparent is the present holder's son, Hon. Harry Maximilian Beckett (born 1993).

Male-line family tree

Arms

See also 
Beckett baronets, of Kirkdale Manor

Notes

References 

 
 

Baronies in the Peerage of the United Kingdom
Noble titles created in 1886
Peerages created with special remainders
Grimthorpe